Glenwood is a suburb of Sydney, in the state of New South Wales, Australia. Glenwood is located 33 kilometres north-west of the Sydney central business district in the local government area of the City of Blacktown. Glenwood is part of the Hills District within the Greater Western Sydney region.

History 
Glenwood takes its name from an historic property in the area, named 'Glenwood Park' in the 1940s, but previously known as Norfolk Vale (1846–1882), and Sorrento (1882–1941). It was formally recognized as a suburb in 1996.

It is noted as the first site to be developed within the Rouse Hill Development area.

Heritage listings 
Glenwood has a heritage-listed site, which is:
 2 Knightsbridge Avenue: Exeter Farm

Population 
At the 2011 census, there were 15,325 residents in Glenwood. The population was younger than average, with a median age of 32, and 26.6% of people aged 14 years and under. Just over half of residents were born in Australia. The top other countries of birth are India 29.5%, Philippines 5.1% and Sri Lanka 2.5%. Almost half of residents spoke a language other than English at home. These languages included Punjabi 6.7%, Hindi 5.4% and Tagalog 3.1%. Most dwellings were separate houses and these tended to be large, with 81.6% having 4 or more bedrooms.

In the 2016 Census, there were 16,130 residents in Glenwood. The median age of the population was 34, younger than the median age for New South Wales and Australia (38 years). 23.2% of the people were 14 years and under. 51% of Glenwood's residents were born in Australia, 33.5% were born in India, 4.8% were born in the Philippines, 2.8% in Sri Lanka, 2% in China and 1.9% in Fiji. Only English was spoken in 50.1% of the homes but other languages spoken at home included Punjabi 9.5%, Hindi 5.6%, Tagalog 2.9%, Mandarin 2.6% and Sinhalese 2.1%.

Transport 
The Westlink M7 Motorway runs along the southern border of the suburb and provides a link to the M2 Hills Motorway.  Old Windsor Road borders the suburb to the east & Sunnyholt Rd borders the suburb to the west & north.

Metroconnect by Hillsbus provides an on demand bus service connecting Glenwood with Bella Vista, Norwest and  stations.

Hillsbus provides services to Rouse Hill 663, 664, 665,Parramatta (663, 664, 665), North Sydney (602X) and Sydney CBD (607X, 616X) whilst Busways provides regular services to Norwest Business Park (730, 745), Blacktown (730), Bella Vista (745) and Castle Hill (730).

The suburb is serviced by Burns and Sorrento stations on the Blacktown-Parklea branch of the North-West T-way, and Burns, Balmoral, Celebration, Meurants and Norbrik stations on the Rouse Hill-Parramatta section of the T-way.

Schools 
Glenwood High School, Caddies Creek Public School, Parklea Public School and Holy Cross Primary School.

Churches 
Emmanuel Baptist Church

Valentine Sport Park 
Valentine Sport Park, at which the headquarters of Football NSW are located, in Glenwood is a multipurpose sporting complex which caters for various groups, as well as individuals.

Sporting clubs 
Sporting clubs in the Glenwood suburb include:

Rugby League 
Northwest Hurricanes Junior Rugby League Club
St Patricks Blacktown Junior Rugby League Club (despite the name, this club is based in Glenwood.)

Netball 
Glenwood Netball Club

Association Football 
Glenwood Redbacks Soccer Club

Rugby Union 
Blacktown Warriors Rugby Union Football Club
Norwest "Bulls" Junior Rugby Union Club

References 

Suburbs of Sydney
City of Blacktown
Populated places established in 1996
1996 establishments in Australia